Meriç Sümen (born May 25, 1943) is a Turkish former ballerina and a choreographer.

Life
Meriç Sümen was born at Silivri, Turkey in 1943. She completed the ballet section of Ankara State Conservatory in 1961. She began a dancing career in the Ankara Opera House. In addition to her ballet career, she often served in the administrative body. She was the art director between 1979 and 1986 in Ankara, between 1986-1989 and 2000–2002 in İstanbul ballets. On 5 July 2005, she was appointed director general of the Turkish State Opera and Ballet  She retired on 15 October 2007.

She is married and the mother of a son named Tunca, who is also a ballet dancer.

Career
In the early years, she gained fame in her performance in the romantic ballet Giselle. She performed Giselle in Sofia, Bulgaria and Moscow, the Soviet Union. She was the first ever foreign prima ballerina in Bolshoi Ballet. She also took part in many ballets in Leningrad, Kiew, Minsk, Riga and Odessa, all then in the former Soviet Union. In later years, she also performed in the United States, Great Britain, Japan, Italy, the Netherlands, Poland, former Yugoslavia, Germany, Bulgaria, Algeria, Egypt, Tunis, Pakistan   and Denmark. In 1983–1984, she obtained a teaching certificate from the Bolshoi. In 1998, she taught in Texas Ballet Theater. Many times in International ballet competitions, she took part in the jury.

Legacy
In 1981, she was awarded the honorary title State Artist. So far she is the only ballet dancer to gain this title. In 2010, Nevsal Baylas wrote a book about Meriç Sümen titled Dansa Aşık Bir Kuğu ("The Swan who fell in love with Dance") .

Her performances

References

Living people
1943 births
People from Silivri
Ankara State Conservatory alumni
Turkish ballerinas
Turkish women civil servants
Turkish civil servants
Turkish choreographers